David Philani Moyo (born 17 December 1994) is a Zimbabwean professional footballer who plays as a forward for National League club Barnet on loan from EFL League Two club Barrow. He represents the Zimbabwe national team.

Career
Moyo started a two-year scholarship with Northampton Town in the summer of 2011 after joining from AFC Dunstable. In October 2012, he was awarded his first squad number by manager Aidy Boothroyd, after a prolific scoring record for the youth side. He made his professional debut on 3 November 2012, in a 1–1 draw with Bradford City in the FA Cup, coming on as a substitute for Anthony Charles. In March 2013, he was offered a professional contract with Northampton Town along with Claudio Dias.

In the 2013–14 season Moyo spent some time out on loan at Northern Premier Division side Stamford, netting 4 goals in all competitions. He left Northampton Town on 12 January after his contract was terminated by the club.

On 12 January 2015 he signed a permanent contract with Brackley Town.

After playing for St Albans, in July 2019 he signed for Hamilton Academical. On 29 December 2019, he scored his first goal for the club, the winning goal as Hamilton won 2–1 away to Motherwell in the Lanarkshire derby. In March 2020 he signed a contract extension with Hamilton until 2021.

On 7 August 2020, Moyo signed a new three-year deal at Hamilton, keeping him at the club until 2023. 

In November 2020, Moyo was called up for the Zimbabwe national team ahead of the African Cup of Nations qualifiers.

On 30 May 2022, Hamilton confirmed that they and Moyo had reached an agreement to release him from his contract.

On 8 August 2022, Moyo signed for Barrow on a one-year deal. On 29 December, he joined Barnet on loan until the end of the season.

Career statistics

Club

References

External links
 
 

 

1994 births
Living people
Zimbabwean footballers
Association football forwards
Northampton Town F.C. players
Stamford A.F.C. players
Brackley Town F.C. players 
Hemel Hempstead Town F.C. players
St Albans City F.C. players
Hamilton Academical F.C. players
English Football League players
Northern Football League players
National League (English football) players 
Scottish Professional Football League players
Zimbabwe international footballers
Sportspeople from Harare
Expatriate footballers in Scotland
Expatriate footballers in England
Zimbabwean emigrants to the United Kingdom
Zimbabwean expatriate footballers
2021 Africa Cup of Nations players